Moapa Valley High School is a 3A public high school in Overton, Nevada, United States and is part of the Clark County School District (CCSD). It has an approximated number of students of 562. The school mascot is the pirate.

History
In the year 1914 Moapa Valley High School opened. This school housed grades kindergarten through 12. The original building was a gothic style two-story masonry building. Moapa Valley's first graduating class graduated in 1919 and consisted of two students. The first principal was Mr Liljenquist. As the town grew a second building was added in 1922, this included a 250-seat auditorium and a gymnasium. In the 1930s the federal government helped build a second gym, the old gym was then converted into a library. In 1956 Moapa Valley High School became a part of the Clark County School District.  More information concerning the school and the valley can be found in the books 100 Years on the Muddy, or Grant M. Bowler: The Man and His Time.

See also
 Moapa Valley, Nevada
 List of high schools in Nevada

References

External links
 

High schools in Clark County, Nevada
Educational institutions established in 1914
1914 establishments in Nevada
Public high schools in Nevada